Billion Dollar Day is a documentary about currency trading created by the British Broadcasting Corporation on 4 June 1985. The documentary focuses on three traders, each located in New York, London, and Hong Kong. The traders are followed throughout a typical day in order to demonstrate the challenges and dedication of each trader.

More than a Billion is exchanged during the course of 24 hours while trading GBP, USD, and German Marks. The documentary is considered a landmark in International Business Schools and currency trading circles.

References

Documentary films about business
BBC television documentaries
Foreign exchange market